Sāwaṇ or Sāuṇ is the fifth month in the Nanakshahi calendar. Many Indian calendars started in different eras such as Shaka Calendar (national calendar of India) traditional Vikrama as well as the Nanakshahi calendar which governs the activities within Sikhism. This month coincides with the Sanskrit श्रावण Shraavana in the Hindu calendar and the Indian national calendar, with which it shares derivation, and with July and August in the Gregorian and Julian calendars and is 31 days long, like the Gregorian and Julian calendars.

This month is the most humid month of the year in South Asia.

Important events during this month

July
July 16 - Aug 15 (1 Sawan) - The start of the month Sawan
July 23 (8 Sawan) - Birth of Guru Har Krishan

August
August 16 (1 Bhadon) - The end of the month Sawan(sawansasaram) and the start of Bhadon

See also
Punjabi calendar

References

External links
www.srigranth.org Guru Granth Sahib Page 133
Imprtance of sawan (Sawan ka Mahatva) By Jaibhole.co.in

Months of the Nanakshahi calendar
Sikh terminology